In mathematics, the standard conjectures about algebraic cycles are several conjectures describing the relationship of algebraic cycles and Weil cohomology theories. One of the original applications of these conjectures, envisaged by Alexander Grothendieck, was to prove that his construction of pure motives gave an abelian category that is semisimple. Moreover, as he pointed out, the standard conjectures also imply the hardest part of the Weil conjectures, namely the "Riemann hypothesis" conjecture that remained open at the end of the 1960s and was proved later by Pierre Deligne; for details on the link between Weil and standard conjectures, see . The standard conjectures remain open problems, so that their application gives only conditional proofs of results. In quite a few cases, including that of the Weil conjectures, other methods have been found to prove such results unconditionally.

The classical formulations of the standard conjectures involve a fixed Weil cohomology theory . All of the conjectures deal with "algebraic" cohomology classes, which means a morphism on the cohomology of a smooth projective variety

induced by an algebraic cycle with rational coefficients on the product  via the cycle class map, which is part of the structure of a Weil cohomology theory.

Conjecture A is equivalent to Conjecture B (see , p. 196), and so is not listed.

Lefschetz type Standard Conjecture (Conjecture B)
One of the axioms of a Weil theory is the so-called hard Lefschetz theorem (or axiom):

Begin with a fixed smooth hyperplane section

,

,

.

Now, for  define:

The conjecture states that the Lefschetz operator is induced by an algebraic cycle.

Künneth type Standard Conjecture (Conjecture C)
It is conjectured that the projectors

are algebraic, i.e. induced by a cycle  with rational coefficients. This implies that the motive of any smooth projective variety (and more generally, every pure motive) decomposes as

The motives  and  can always be split off as direct summands. The conjecture therefore immediately holds for curves.
 have used the Weil conjectures to show the conjecture for algebraic varieties defined over finite fields, in arbitrary dimension. 

 proved the Künneth decomposition for abelian varieties A.
 proved the Künneth decomposition for the Hilbert scheme of points in a smooth surface.

Conjecture D (numerical equivalence vs. homological equivalence) 
Conjecture D states that numerical and homological equivalence agree. (It implies in particular the latter does not depend on the choice of the Weil cohomology theory). This conjecture implies the Lefschetz conjecture. If the Hodge standard conjecture holds, then the Lefschetz conjecture and Conjecture D are equivalent.

This conjecture was shown by Lieberman for varieties of dimension at most 4, and for abelian varieties.

The Hodge Standard Conjecture 
The Hodge standard conjecture is modelled on the Hodge index theorem. It states the definiteness (positive or negative, according to the dimension) of the cup product pairing on primitive algebraic cohomology classes. If it holds, then the Lefschetz conjecture implies Conjecture D. In characteristic zero the Hodge standard conjecture holds, being a consequence of Hodge theory. In positive characteristic the Hodge standard conjecture is known for surfaces and for abelian varieties of dimension 4.

The Hodge conjecture implies the Lefschetz and Künneth conjectures and conjecture D for varieties over fields of characteristic zero. The Tate conjecture implies Lefschetz, Künneth, and conjecture D for ℓ-adic cohomology over all fields.

Permanence properties of the standard conjectures

For two algebraic varieties X and Y,  has introduced a condition that Y is motivated by X. The precise condition is that the motive of Y is (in André's category of motives) expressible starting from the motive of X by means of sums, summands, and products. For example, Y is motivated if there is a surjective morphism . If Y is not found in the category, it is unmotivated in that context. For smooth projective complex algebraic varieties X and Y, such that Y is motivated by X, the standard conjectures D (homological equivalence equals numerical), B (Lefschetz), the Hodge conjecture and also the generalized Hodge conjecture hold for Y if they hold for all powers of X. This fact can be applied to show, for example, the Lefschetz conjecture for the Hilbert scheme of points on an algebraic surface.

Relation to other conjectures
 has shown that the (conjectural) existence of the so-called motivic t-structure on the triangulated category of motives implies the Lefschetz and Künneth standard conjectures B and C.

References 

 

 

 

 

 
	
.

.

 

.

External links 
Progress on the standard conjectures on algebraic cycles
 Analogues Kähleriens de certaines conjectures de Weil. J.-P Serre (extrait d'une lettre a A. Weil, 9 Nov. 1959) scan
 

Algebraic geometry
Conjectures
Unsolved problems in geometry